Au, Switzerland may refer to:
Au, St. Gallen, a municipality in the Canton of St. Gallen
Au, Zürich, a municipality in the Canton of Zürich